Liam "The Hitman" Harrison (born 5 October 1985) is an English welterweight Muay Thai fighter currently fighting out of Bad Company (when based in the UK) and trains at Jitti Gym and Yokkao Training Center in Bangkok (when fighting in Thailand).

Background
Brought up in Leeds, Harrison first started training in Muay Thai aged 13, when he joined the Bad Company gym in Harehills. There he trained under Richard Smith, still his current trainer, who is a former British, Commonwealth and European kickboxing champion. Harrison was large for his age and made his amateur debut aged 14, winning in a no head contact fight. He made his pro debut not much later, just before his fifteenth birthday, defeating Martin Shivnan via knockout in around 30 seconds. Success on his pro debut led to a number of victories on the local scene culminating in a bout for the S.I.M.T.A. Northern Area title, which he won against opponent Abdul Arif, again by first-round knockout.

Career
Between 2000 and 2004 Liam established himself as the top fighter in the United Kingdom in his weight class, having moved up from featherweight (52 kg/114.4 lbs) to light welterweight (63.5 kg/139.7 lbs) and having beaten domestic and international competition including Ait Said Aberderahman, Preechapon Por Nuongubon, Satoruvasikoba. At the end of 2004 Harrison travelled to Italy where he was supposed to face reigning champion Massimo Rizzoli for his W.A.K.O. low-kick kickboxing world title. Rizzoli suffered an injury and Liam faced the W.A.K.O. European champion Emannuel Di Profetis instead. Despite the late change of opponent and fighting in a rule set different from Muay Thai, Harrison won the match by technical knockout to become world champion.

The win in Italy was followed by success at home when Harrison defeated Dutch-based kickboxer Mohamed Ajuou to claim the European version of the S.I.M.T.A. belt. In following fights Harrison beat Abdoulaye M'baye and Benzouaoua Hakim as well as Hiromasa Masuda in a rematch from 2003 and was still undefeated into 2005. He made his Thai debut in August of that year, losing a split decision to Witthayanoi Sitkuanem at Rajadamnern Stadium in what was the first defeat of his pro career. Harrison suffered a second consecutive loss a few months later on his return to England, losing to another Thai in Duwao Kongudom who was a highly rated Omnoi Stadium champion, in a match in Wolverhampton.

Despite suffering two defeats including losing his Thai debut Harrison headed back to Thailand at the end of 2005.  He won his first title on Thai soil by defeating a much bigger Russian opponent to claim the Patong Stadium belt at 68 kg (149.6 lbs). With his first victory in Thailand, Liam strung together five more victories in the country throughout 2006 which included winning the W.P.M.F. light welterweight belt against reigning champion Masa Hiroshima as well as retaining his Patong stadium title. He also re-matched Witthayanoi Sitkuanem but was once again unsuccessful. That year was awarded the "Leeds Sports Federation Sportsman of the Year" award.

Throughout 2007 Liam fought primarily in Thailand, basing himself at the Jitti Gym in Bangkok. He fought a number of bouts at the major stadiums including at Lumpinee Stadium, managing to successful defend his W.P.M.F. world title two times that year. He also made brief forays back to the United Kingdom, facing W.M.C. world champion Numphon PK Sterio two times that year. Liam lost the first match between the pair, but won the second in Manchester in November via a fourth-round KO, picking up his biggest victory up to that point as well as winning the W.M.C. lightweight world title. He was also named as the Muay Siam magazine's top foreign fighter of the year.

In 2008 Harrison fought a number of bouts at Bad Company promoted shows in his home town of Leeds, with wins over Benabdeljelil Mehdi and Masaru Ito. He also retained his W.M.C. lightweight world title by stopping Sarmsamut Kiatchongkao in June of that year. In 2009 Harrison lost a decision to Saenchai Sor Kingstar in London. He then headed to Jamaica to face Anuwat Kaewsamrit, being defeated via TKO and losing his W.M.C. world title in what was his first ever stoppage loss.

Harrison would gain revenge against Anuwat Kaewsamrit in March 2010, defeating him by unanimous decision over five rounds in their rematch in Manchester. Although Anuwat was not at his peak anymore he was Harrison's best victory up to date. He would also have the chance to enhance his name by entering the inaugural Thai Fight competition, an event involving sixteen Muay Thai fighters at 67 kg/147.4 lbs with a first place prize of 2,000,000 Baht (around $62,000). Despite being one of the smaller fighters at the tournament he outworked Behzad Rafigh Doust in his first match forcing him to quit in the second round. Going into the quarter finals Liam then knocked out Soishiro Miyakoshi with elbows. Harrison was later disqualified from the tournament for coming in over the weight. He insisted it being the result of a sickness he caught prior to the match.

In 2011 Harrison had two rematches against opponents who had defeated him in the past. He lost both of them, against Saenchai Sor Kingstar and Petaswin Seatranferry, who had defeated him at an event in Glasgow the previous year.

On 31 March 2012 he beat Andrei Kulebin by TKO in round 3 using his kicks.

Harrison lost to Saenchai PKSaenchaimuaythaigym for the third time at Muay Thai Warriors in Macau on 9 December 2012, losing a clear-cut unanimous decision.

He competed in the Glory 8: Tokyo - 2013 65kg Slam in Tokyo, Japan on 3 May 2013. He lost to Masaaki Noiri via TKO due to a cut in round two in the quarter-finals.

He lost to Sagetdao Petpayathai by decision in the semi-finals of a four-man 68 kg tournament at MAX Muay Thai 3 in Zhengzhou, China on 10 August 2013.

Harrison stopped his four-fight losing streak with a unanimous decision victory over Dylan Salvador at The Main Event 2013 in Manchester, England on 2 November 2013.

He was set to fight Damien Alamos for his Yokkao promotional debut at Yokkao 8 in Bolton, England on 8 March 2014 but Alamos withdrew from the fight, claiming to have a hand injury, and was replaced by Houcine Bennoui. He defeated Bennoui on points in a five-round -65 kg Muay Thai bout.

Harrison defended his Yokkao 65 kg title on 25 March 2017 at Yokkao 24 against Ryan Mekki.

In 2018, Harrison inked a non-exclusive deal with ONE Championship to compete in ONE Super Series Muay Thai. He lost his first two bouts to Petchmorakot Petchyindee Academy at ONE: Destiny of Champions and Rodlek at ONE: Legendary Quest, but won by first-round KO in his third bout with the organization at ONE: A New Tomorrow against Mohammed Bin Mahmoud.

Harrison was scheduled to face the former Lumpinee Boxing Stadium champion Muangthai P.K. Saenchaimuaythaigym at ONE 156 on 22 April 2022. He won the fight by a first-round technical knockout. Harrison was awarded a $100,000 bonus for winning the fight.

Harrison faced Nong-O Gaiyanghadao for the ONE Bantamweight Muay Thai World Championship at ONE on Prime Video 1 on 27 August 2022. He lost the bout in the first round after being unable to continue due to leg kicks.

Harrison was scheduled to face Pongsiri P.K.Saenchaimuaythaigym on January 14, 2023, at ONE Fight Night 6. However, Harrison withdrew from the event due to injuries and requiring surgery. As a result, the bout was scrapped.
Harrison was scheduled to fight former unified multiple division champion Floyd Mayweather Jr. in a exhibition bout, but pulled out.

Titles and accomplishments 

Titles
Kombat League
2016 Kombat League World Champion

WBC Muaythai
2014 WBC Muaythai (147 lbs) World Champion
2011 WBC Muaythai (147 lbs) International Champion

World Muaythai Council
2007-09 W.M.C. Muaythai Lightweight World Champion -61.5 kg (1 title defense)

World Professional Muaythai Federation
2006-07 W.P.M.F. Muaythai World Champion -63.5 kg (2 title defenses - vacated)

Patong Stadium
2006 Patong Stadium Muaythai Super Welterweight Champion -68 kg (1 title defense)

Sitnarong International Muaythai Association
2005 S.I.M.T.A. Muaythai Lightweight European Champion -61.5 kg
2001 S.I.M.T.A. Muaythai Super Featherweight Northern Area Champion -52 kg

World Association of Kickboxing Organizations
2004 W.A.K.O. Pro Low-kick Kickboxing World Champion -62 kg

Awards
2007/08 Leeds Sports Federation Sportsman of the Year winner
2007 Muay Siam Magazine Foreign Fighter of the Year winner
2006/07 Leeds Sports Federation Sportsman of the Year winner
2004/05 Leeds Sports Federation Sportsman of the Year runner up

Kickboxing record

|-  bgcolor="#FFBBBB"
| 2022-08-27|| Loss ||align=left| Nong-O Gaiyanghadao ||  ONE on Prime Video 1 || Kallang, Singapore || TKO (leg kick) || 1 || 2:10
|-
! style=background:white colspan=9 |
|- bgcolor="#CCFFCC" 
| 2022-04-22|| Win ||align=left| Muangthai P.K.Saenchai || ONE 156 || Kallang, Singapore || TKO (3 Knockdowns) || 1 || 2:16
|-  bgcolor="#CCFFCC"
| 2021-10-09|| Win ||align=left| Brayan Matias || Road to ONE: Muay Thai Grand Prix || London, England || Decision || 5 || 3:00  
|-  bgcolor="#CCFFCC"
| 2020-03-07|| Win ||align=left| Khyzer Hayat  || |YOKKAO 48 || Bolton, England || Decision || 5 || 3:00
|-  bgcolor="#CCFFCC"
| 2020-01-10|| Win || align="left" | Mohammed Bin Mahmoud || ONE Championship: A New Tomorrow || Bangkok, Thailand || KO (Punches) || 1 || 2:03
|-  bgcolor="#CCFFCC"
| 2019-08-05|| Win ||align=left| Cristian Faustino || |YOKKAO 41 || Dublin, Ireland || TKO (Doctor stoppage) || 4 || 3:00
|-  bgcolor="#FFBBBB"
| 2019-06-15|| Loss ||align=left| Rodlek Jaotalaytong  || |ONE Championship: Legendary Quest || China || Decision (Unanimous) || 3 || 3:00
|-  bgcolor="#CCFFCC"
| 2019-01-26|| Win || align="left" | Ivan Naccari || YOKKAO 36|| Italy || Decision || 3 || 3:00
|-  bgcolor="#FFBBBB"
| 2018-12-07|| Loss ||align=left| Phetmorakot Wor Sangprapai || |ONE Championship: Destiny of Champions || Malaysia || KO (Left Elbow) || 2 || 1:15
|-
|-  bgcolor="#FFBBBB"
| 2018-07-07 || Loss|| align=left | Charlie Peters || Muay Thai Grand Prix 17 ||London, England||Decision (Unanimous)
|5
|3:00
|-
|-  bgcolor="#FFBBBB"
| 2017-12-09 || Loss ||align=left| Bobo Sacko || Golden Fight || France || Decision (Unanimous) || 5 || 3:00
|-
|-  bgcolor="#CCFFCC"
| 2017-10-15 || Win||align=left| Kevin Burmester || Yokkao 27 || Bolton, England || TKO (Low Kick) ||2|| 1:00
|-
|-  bgcolor="#CCFFCC"
| 2017-08-26 || Win||align=left|Charles François || Science of 8 Promotions || United Kingdom || TKO (Three Knockdowns) ||3||
|-
|-  bgcolor="#CCFFCC"
| 2017-03-25 || Win||align=left| Rayan Mekki || Yokkao 24 || Bolton, England || TKO ||3|| 2:20
|-  bgcolor="#CCFFCC"
| 2017-02-12 || Win||align=left| Jesus Romero || TML1 || Manchester, England || Decision (Unanimous) ||5|| 3:00
|-
! style=background:white colspan=9 |
|- style="background:#fbb;"
| 2016-10-08|| Loss ||align=left| Fabio Pinca || Yokkao 19 || Bolton, England || Decision (Unanimous) || 5 || 3:00
|-  bgcolor="#CCFFCC"
| 2016-07-17 || Win ||align=left| Mauro Serra || Hearts On Fire || Italy || TKO (Left Hook)|| 5 || 3:00
|-
! style=background:white colspan=9 |
|-
|-  bgcolor="#CCFFCC"
| 2016-03-19 || Win ||align=left| Tetsuya Yamato || Yokkao 17 || Bolton, England || Decision || 5 || 3:00
|-
! style=background:white colspan=9 |
|-
|- style="background:;"
| 2015-11-22||  ||align=left| Emad Kadyear || Bad Company Show || Leeds, England ||  ||  ||  
|-
|-  bgcolor="#FFBBBB"|-
|- style="background:#fbb;"
| 2015-10-10|| Loss ||align=left| Singdam Kiatmoo9 || Yokkao 15 || Bolton, England || Decision || 5 || 3:00 
|-
|-  bgcolor="#CCFFCC"
| 2015-7-31|| Win ||align=left| Malaipet Sasiprapa || Lion Fight 23 || Los Angeles, United States || Decision(Split) || 5 || 3:00 
|-
|-  bgcolor="#FFBBBB"|-
|- style="background:#fbb;"
| 2015-03-21|| Loss ||align=left| Pakorn PKSaenchaimuaythaigym || Yokkao 13 || Bolton, England || Unanimous Decision || 5 || 3:00 
|-
! style=background:white colspan=9 |
|-  bgcolor="#CCFFCC"
| 2014-09-09 || Win ||align=left| Mehdi Zatout || Smash 10 || Liverpool, England || Decision || 5 || 3:00
|-
! style=background:white colspan=9 |
|-
|-  bgcolor="#CCFFCC"
| 2014-03-08 || Win ||align=left| Houcine Bennoui || Yokkao 8 || Bolton, England || Decision || 5 || 3:00
|-
|-  bgcolor="#CCFFCC"
| 2013-11-02 || Win ||align=left| Dylan Salvador || The Main Event 2013 || Manchester, England || Decision (unanimous) || 5 || 3:00
|-
|-  bgcolor="#FFBBBB"
| 2013-08-10 || Loss ||align=left| Sagetdao Petpayathai || MAX Muay Thai 3, Semi Finals || Zhengzhou, China || Decision || 3 || 3:00
|-
|-  bgcolor="#FFBBBB"
| 2013-05-03 || Loss ||align=left| Masaaki Noiri || Glory 8: Tokyo - 65 kg Slam Tournament, Quarter Finals || Tokyo, Japan || TKO (cut) || 2 || 
|-
|-  bgcolor="#FFBBBB"
| 2013-03-23 || Loss ||align=left| Mosab Amrani || Glory 5: London || London, England || KO (left hook to the body) || 1 || 1:20
|-
|-  bgcolor="#FFBBBB"
| 2012-12-09 || Loss ||align=left| Saenchai PKSaenchaimuaythaigym || Muay Thai Warriors || Macau || Decision (unanimous) || 5 || 3:00
|-
! style=background:white colspan=9 |
|-
|-  bgcolor="#CCFFCC"
| 2012-03-31 || Win ||align=left| Andrei Kulebin || The Main Event || Manchester, England || TKO (leg kicks) || 3 || 1:00
|-
|-  bgcolor="#FFBBBB"
| 2011-10-08 || Loss ||align=left| Mohamed Khamal || Muaythai Premier League: Round 2 || Padua, Italy || Decision (Split) || 5 || 3:00
|-
|-  bgcolor="#CCFFCC"
| 2011-07-23 || Win ||align=left| Justin Greskiewicz || Warriors Cup XII || Lincroft, New Jersey || TKO (referee stop) || 2 || 3:00
|-
|-
|-  bgcolor="#FFBBBB"
| 2011-04-09 || Loss ||align=left| Saenchai Sor Kingstar || Fight Sport Industries || Doncaster, England, UK || Decision || 5 || 3:00
|-
|-  bgcolor="#FFBBBB"
| 2011-02-19 || Loss ||align=left| Petaswin Seatranferry || Super Showdown II
|| Glasgow, Scotland, UK || Decision || 5 || 3:00
|-
|-  bgcolor="#CCFFCC"
| 2010-10-25 || Win ||align=left| Soichiro Miyakoshi || THAI FIGHT - Final 8 || Bangkok, Thailand || KO (Elbow) || 2 || 
|-
! style=background:white colspan=9 |
|-
|-  bgcolor="#CCFFCC"
| 2010-08-29 || Win ||align=left| Behzad Rafigh Doust || THAI FIGHT - Final 16 || Bangkok, Thailand || TKO (Low Kicks and punches) || 2 ||
|-
|-  bgcolor="#FFBBBB"
| 2010-05-24 || Loss ||align=left| Petaswin Seatranferry || Patong Stadium || Phuket, Thailand || Decision || 5 || 3:00
|-
|-  bgcolor="#CCFFCC"
| 2010-03-27 || Win ||align=left| Anuwat Kaewsamrit || MSA Muaythai Premier League
|| Manchester, England, UK || Decision (Unanimous) || 5 || 3:00
|-
|-  bgcolor="#FFBBBB"
| 2009-11-07 || Loss ||align=left| Sagetdao Petpayathai || MSA Muaythai Premier League || Bolton, England, UK || Decision || 5 || 3:00
|-
|-  bgcolor="#CCFFCC"
| 2009-09-12 || Win ||align=left| Buray Bozaryilmaz || For The Glory Of|| Liverpool, England, UK || TKO (Ref Stop) || 2 || 
|-
|-  bgcolor="#FFBBBB"
| 2009-06-26 || Loss ||align=left| Anuwat Kaewsamrit || Champions of Champions 2 || Montego Bay, Jamaica || TKO (Right Low Kicks) || 3 || 0:35
|-
! style=background:white colspan=9 |
|-
|-  bgcolor="#CCFFCC"
| 2009-05-30 || Win ||align=left| Jedeechai Sor Khamsing || Lumpinee Stadium|| Bangkok, Thailand || TKO (Leg Kicks) || 3 || 
|-
|-  bgcolor="#FFBBBB"
| 2009-02-07 || Loss ||align=left| Saenchai Sor Kingstar || Muay Thai Legends|| London, England, UK || Decision || 5 || 3:00
|-
|-  bgcolor="#CCFFCC"
| 2008-10-18 || Win ||align=left| Masaru Ito || I.S.K.A. World Championship Kickboxing, Super Fight|| Leeds, England, UK || Decision (Unanimous) || 5 || 3:00
|-
|-  bgcolor="#CCFFCC"
| 2008-06-14 || Win ||align=left| Sarmsamut Kiatchongkao || World Championship Thai-Boxing || Leeds, England, UK || TKO (Cut) || 4 || 
|-
! style=background:white colspan=9 |
|-
|-  bgcolor="#CCFFCC"
| 2008-04-19 || Win ||align=left| Benabdeljelil Mehdi || Bad Company Show || Leeds, England, UK || TKO (Body Shot) || 3 || 
|-
|-  bgcolor="#CCFFCC"
| 2007-11-25 || Win ||align=left| Numphon PK Sterio || MSA Muaythai Premier League || Manchester, England, UK || KO (Left Hook)|| 4 || 
|-
! style=background:white colspan=9 |
|-
|-  bgcolor="#CCFFCC"
| 2007-10-28 || Win ||align=left| Sornkom Jocky Gym || Power Of Scotland 3 || Glasgow, Scotland, UK || TKO (Cut by Elbow) || 2 || 
|-
|-  bgcolor="#CCFFCC"
| 2007-09-22 || Win ||align=left| Ahmed Saadi || W.P.M.F. Promotion, Lumpinee Stadium || Bangkok, Thailand || KO (Left Hook) || 2 ||
|-
! style=background:white colspan=9 |
|-
|-  bgcolor="#CCFFCC"
| 2007-08-23(approx) || Win ||align=left| Chey Kosal || Pro-Boxing || Cambodia || Decision || 6 || 3:00
|-
! style=background:white colspan=9 |
|-
|-  bgcolor="#FFBBBB"
| 2007-06-23 || Loss ||align=left| Numphon PK Sterio || Bad Company/ShowSport International: Thai-Boxing || Leeds, England, UK || Decision || 5 || 3:00
|-
! style=background:white colspan=9 |
|-
|-  bgcolor="#CCFFCC"
| 2007-08-18 || Win ||align=left| Thanonsak Muangseema || Rajadamnern Stadium || Bangkok, Stadium || KO (Low kicks) || 3 ||
|-
|-  bgcolor="#FFBBBB"
| 2007-04-08 || Loss ||align=left| Gupi Wor Suthira || Rajadamnern Stadium || Bangkok, Thailand || Decision || 5 || 3:00
|-
|-  bgcolor="#CCFFCC"
| 2007-03-16 || Win ||align=left| Masood Patongmuaythai || W.P.M.F. Promotion || Ayutthaya, Thailand || KO (Right Punch) || 4 || 
|-
! style=background:white colspan=9 |
|-
|-  bgcolor="#CCFFCC"
| 2007-02-18 || Win ||align=left| Rungsiam || Master Sken's Show || Manchester, England, UK || Decision || 5 || 3:00
|-
|-  bgcolor="#FFBBBB"
| 2006-11-25 || Loss ||align=left| Petchaek Sor Suwanphakdee || Muay Thai Superfights || Wolverhampton Civic Hall || Decision || 5 || 3:00
|-
|-  bgcolor="#CCFFCC"
| 2006-08-06 || Win ||align=left| Rungrit Noi || Rajadamnern Stadium || Bangkok, Thailand || Decision || 5 || 3:00
|-
|-  bgcolor="#CCFFCC"
| 2006-07-17 || Win ||align=left| Ronnie Neergard || Patong Stadium || Phuket, Thailand || TKO (Low Kicks) || 3 || 
|-
! style=background:white colspan=9 |
|-
|-  bgcolor="#CCFFCC"
| 2006-06-17 || Win ||align=left| Mickael Lallemand || Bad Company Show || Leeds, England, UK || TKO (Leg Kick) || 2 || 
|-
|-  bgcolor="#FFBBBB"
| 2006-03-30 || Loss ||align=left| Witthayanoi Sitkuanem || Rajadamnern Stadium || Bangkok, Thailand || Decision || 5 || 3:00
|-
|-  bgcolor="#CCFFCC"
| 2006-02-26 || Win ||align=left| Jaroensap Kiatbanchong || Patong Stadium || Phuket, Thailand || TKO (Ref Stop) || 2 || 3:00
|-
|-  bgcolor="#CCFFCC"
| 2006-02-10 || Win ||align=left| Masamitsu Hirashima || W.P.M.F. Promotion || Chainat Province, Thailand || Decision (Unanimous) || 5 || 3:00
|-
! style=background:white colspan=9 |
|-
|-  bgcolor="#CCFFCC"
| 2006-01-23 || Win ||align=left| Klaynoi Sit Bankrajen || Phetbanchan Stadium || Koh Samui, Thailand || KO (Right Punch) || 2 || 
|-
|-  bgcolor="#CCFFCC"
| 2005-12-22 || Win ||align=left| Dzhabar Askerov || Patong Stadium || Phuket, Thailand || DQ (Kick on Floor) || 4 || 
|-
! style=background:white colspan=9 |
|-
|-  bgcolor="#FFBBBB"
| 2005-11-20 || Loss ||align=left| Duwao Kongudom || Muay Thai Superfights || Wolverhampton, England, UK || Decision || 5 || 3:00
|-
|-  bgcolor="#FFBBBB"
| 2005-08-21 || Loss ||align=left| Witthayanoi Sitkuanem || Rajadamnern Stadium || Bangkok, Thailand || Decision (Split) || 5 || 3:00
|-
|-  bgcolor="#CCFFCC"
| 2005-07-24 || Win ||align=left| Hiromasa Masuda || Japan v World || Tokyo, Japan || KO (Left Hook) ||3 ||2:55
|-
|-  bgcolor="#CCFFCC"
| 2005-06-26 || Win ||align=left| Benzouaoua Hakim || Bad Company Show || Leeds, England, UK || Decision || 5 || 3:00
|-
|-  bgcolor="#CCFFCC"
| 2005-04-23 || Win ||align=left| Abdoulaye M'baye || Pain & Glory '05 || Birmingham, England, UK || Decision (Unanimous) || 5 || 3:00
|-
|-  bgcolor="#CCFFCC"
| 2005-02-27 || Win ||align=left| Mohamed Ajuou || Master Sken's Combat Fight Night || Manchester, England, UK || KO (Left + Right Hook) || 3 || 
|-
! style=background:white colspan=9 |
|-
|-  bgcolor="#CCFFCC"
| 2004-12-03 || Win ||align=left| Emannuel Di Profetis || W.A.K.O. Pro World Cup of Kickboxing || Naples, Italy || TKO (Leg Kicks) || 4 || 
|-
! style=background:white colspan=9 |
|-
|-  bgcolor="#CCFFCC"
| 2004-10-10 || Win ||align=left| Ait Said Aberderahman || Team Bad Company vs Team Dekkers || Leeds, England, UK || TKO (Ref Stop/3 Knockdowns) || 2 || 
|-
|-  bgcolor="#CCFFCC"
| 2004-08-22 || Win ||align=left| Satoruvashicoba || A.J.K.F. Event || Tokyo, Japan || Decision || 5 || 3:00
|-
|-  bgcolor="#CCFFCC"
| 2004-06-24 || Win ||align=left| Aliaksandr Klitsen || England vs Russia || Liverpool, England, UK || Decision || 5 || 3:00
|-
|-  bgcolor="#CCFFCC"
| 2004-04-24 || Win ||align=left| Matthew Johnson || Pain & Glory '04 || Birmingham, England, UK || Decision || 5 || 3:00
|-
|-  bgcolor="#CCFFCC"
| 2004-02-29 || Win ||align=left| Preechapon Por Nuongubon || Master Sken's Show || Manchester, England, UK || Decision || 5 || 3:00
|-
|-  bgcolor="#CCFFCC"
| 2003-09-27 || Win ||align=left| Sayan Keatud || Master Sken's Show: England vs Thailand || Manchester, England, UK || TKO (Low Kicks) || 4 || 
|-
|-  bgcolor="#CCFFCC"
| 2003-07-20 || Win ||align=left| Hiromasa Masuda || A.J.K.F. Kickout || Tokyo, Japan || KO (Right Hook) || 3 || 2:55
|-
|-  bgcolor="#CCFFCC"
| 2003-06-22 || Win ||align=left| Kiawsot || Ali Jacko Show: England vs Thailand || London, England, UK || TKO || 5 || 
|-
|-  bgcolor="#CCFFCC"
| 2003-03-23 || Win ||align=left| Yogendra Parekh || K-Star Show || Birmingham, England, UK || Decision || 5 || 3:00
|-
|-  bgcolor="#CCFFCC"
| 2002-12-01 || Win ||align=left| Daniel Welch || Dean White Show || Wakefield, England, UK || TKO || 3 || 
|-
|-  bgcolor="#CCFFCC"
| 2002-04-28 || Win ||align=left| Abdullah Monadie || Bad Company: World Championship Thai-Boxing, Super Fight || Leeds, England, UK || TKO (Low Kicks) || 2 || 
|-
|-  bgcolor="#c5d2ea"
| 2001-09-29 || Draw ||align=left| Reece Crooke || Bad Company Fight Night || Leeds, England, UK || Decision Draw || 5 || 3:00
|-
|-  bgcolor="#CCFFCC"
| 2001-07-15 || Win ||align=left| Glen Cashmore || Dean White Show || Wakefield, England, UK || Decision || 5 || 3:00
|-
|-  bgcolor="#CCFFCC"
| 2001-04-07 || Win ||align=left| Yousef Abubacar || Bad Company Fight Night || Leeds, England, UK || TKO (Gave Up) || 1 || 
|-
|-  bgcolor="#CCFFCC"
| 2000-00-00 || Win ||align=left| Abdul Arif || Master Sken's || England, UK || KO || 1 || 
|-
! style=background:white colspan=9 |
|-
|-  bgcolor="#CCFFCC"
| 1999-00-00 || Win ||align=left| Martin Shivnan || Master Sken's || England, UK || KO || 1 || 
|-
|-
| colspan=9 | Legend:

See also
List of male kickboxers

References

External links
 The Bad Company Thai Boxing Website
 MAHQ Liam Harrison Bio

1985 births
Living people
sportspeople from Leeds
English male kickboxers
English Muay Thai practitioners
Welterweight kickboxers
Lightweight kickboxers
Featherweight kickboxers
ONE Championship kickboxers